Varad Point (‘Nos Varad’ \'nos va-'rad\) is the rocky point on Foyn Coast, Antarctic Peninsula situated 12.8 km west-southwest of Spur Point and 33.6  km north-northwest of Cape Robinson.

The feature is named after the settlement of Varad in Southern Bulgaria.

Location
British mapping in 1976.

Maps
 British Antarctic Territory.  Scale 1:200000 topographic map. DOS 610 Series, Sheet W 66 64.  Directorate of Overseas Surveys, Tolworth, UK, 1976.
 Antarctic Digital Database (ADD). Scale 1:250000 topographic map of Antarctica. Scientific Committee on Antarctic Research (SCAR). Since 1993, regularly upgraded and updated.

References
 Varad Point. SCAR Composite Antarctic Gazetteer.
 Bulgarian Antarctic Gazetteer. Antarctic Place-names Commission. (details in Bulgarian, basic data in English)

External links
 Varad Point. Copernix satellite image

Headlands of Graham Land
Foyn Coast
Bulgaria and the Antarctic